François de Bourbon, Prince of Conti (19 August 1558 – 3 August 1614) was the third son of Louis de Bourbon, Prince of Condé, a junior line of the House of Bourbon, and his first wife Eléanor de Roucy de Roye. He was given the title of Marquis of Conti and between 1581 and 1597 was elevated to the rank of a prince. The title of Prince of Conti was honorary and did not carry any territorial jurisdiction.

Biography

François was born in La Ferté-sous-Jouarre, in the Île-de-France region. He was a member of a junior line of the House of Bourbon, his first cousin being the future Henry IV of France. Brought up within a highly Protestant family, his mother died in 1564 followed by his father in 1569. His father remarried Françoise d'Orléans, Mademoiselle de Longueville in 1565 and had a further three children, Charles, Count of Soissons being the only child to survive infancy.

Conti, who belonged to the older faith, appears to have taken no part in the French Wars of Religion until 1587, when his distrust of Henry of Lorraine, Duke of Guise caused him to declare against the League and to support his cousin Henry of Navarre, afterwards King Henry IV.

In 1589 after the murder of Henry III he was one of the two princes of the blood who signed the declaration recognising Henry IV as king, and continued to support him even though he himself was mentioned as a candidate for the throne upon the death of Charles, Cardinal de Bourbon in 1590.

Conti's first wife was Jeanne de Coesme, heiress of Bonnétable. She was the mother of Anne de Montafié by her previous marriage to the Count of Montafié. The couple were married at the Palais du Louvre on 17 December 1581, Jeanne died in 1601 having had no children. On 24 July 1605 he married Louise Marguerite of Lorraine (1588–1631), daughter of Duke Henri of Guise and Catherine of Cleves, who was desired by Henry IV. The couple were married at the Château de Meudon. Conti died in 1614 and the title of Prince of Conti lapsed following his death in 1614, as his only child, Marie, predeceased him in 1610. She was only three weeks old.

He had an illegitimate son, Nicolas de Conti (d. 1648), abbot of Gramont.

His widow followed the fortunes of Maria de' Medici, from whom she received many marks of favour, and was secretly married to François de Bassompierre, who joined her in conspiring against Cardinal Richelieu. Upon the exposure of the plot the cardinal exiled her to her estate at Eu, near Amiens, where she died.

Issue
Marie de Bourbon (8 March 1610 – 20 March 1610) died in infancy.

Ancestry

References

Sources

1558 births
1614 deaths
People from La Ferté-sous-Jouarre
House of Bourbon-Conti
Princes of Conti
16th-century peers of France
17th-century peers of France